The 2016–17 2. Bundesliga was the 43rd season of the 2. Bundesliga. It commenced on 5 August 2016 and ended on 21 May 2017. Fixtures for the 2016–17 season were announced on 29 June 2016.

Teams
A total of 18 teams participate in the 2016–17 2. Bundesliga. These include 14 teams from the 2015–16 2. Bundesliga, together with two automatically relegated teams from the 2015–16 Bundesliga, and two automatically promoted teams from the 2015–16 3. Liga. The 16th-placed Bundesliga and third-placed team of the 2. Bundesliga and the 16th-placed 2. Bundesliga team and the third-place finisher in the 3. Liga participated in promotion-relegation playoffs.

On 16 April 2016, Dynamo Dresden won promotion from the 2015–16 3. Liga. Aue followed on 7 May 2016. On 8 May 2016, SC Paderborn was relegated to 2016–17 3. Liga. On 15 May 2016, FSV Frankfurt followed. 1. FC Nürnberg lost its playoff 2–1 on aggregate  and remained in the league.  Finally MSV Duisburg, 16th-placed team of the 2. Bundesliga lost to Würzburger Kickers, third of the 3. Liga, 4–1 on aggregate in a relegation playoff. Würzburg returned to the second level after 38 years via their second consecutive promotion; Duisburg returned immediately to the third level.

Stadiums and locations

Personnel and kits

Managerial changes

League table

Results

Promotion play-offs

Relegation play-offs

First leg

Second leg

Jahn Regensburg won 3–1 on aggregate and were promoted to the 2. Bundesliga.

Statistics

Top goalscorers

Clean sheets

Number of teams by state

References

External links

2016–17 in German football leagues
2016-17
Germ